Reuven Hammer (June 30, 1933 – August 12, 2019) was an American-Israeli Conservative rabbi, scholar of Jewish liturgy, author and lecturer who was born in New York. He was a founder of the "Masorti" (Conservative) movement in Israel and a president of the International Rabbinical Assembly. He served many years as head of the Masorti Beth Din in Israel. A prolific writer in both the Israeli and international press, he was a regular columnist for The Jerusalem Post "Tradition Today" column. He lived in Jerusalem.

Biography
Hammer earned a doctorate in theology and rabbinical ordination from the Jewish Theological Seminary, and a Ph.D. from Northwestern University.

As president of the 1,500-member Rabbinical Assembly of the Conservative movement in Israel, Hammer authored the movement's official commentary on the prayer book, Or Hadash: A Commentary on Siddur Sim Shalom for Shabbat and Festivals, published in March 2003. This work contains the complete text of Siddur Sim Shalom for Shabbat and festivals, surrounded by a comprehensive commentary. The page layout loosely resembles that of the Talmud. In 2008 Rabbi Hammer, also authored the commentary for Or Hadash: A Commentary on Siddur Sim Shalom for Weekdays.

From October 2005 to July 2007 Hammer was the Interim Rabbi at the New London Synagogue in London, England.

Hammer died of a brain tumour on 12 August 2019 in Jerusalem at the age of 86.

Honors and awards
In 2003 Hammer was named to the Forward 50 as one of the most influential Jews in the American Jewish community for his achievements as president of the Rabbinical Assembly. That same year, he received the Simon Greenberg Award for Lifetime Achievement in the Rabbinate by the Ziegler School of Rabbinic Studies of the University of Judaism (now the American Jewish University).

His books Sifre: A Taanaitic commentary on the Book of Deuteronomy (1986) and Entering the High Holy Days: A guide to origins, themes, and prayers (2005) were awarded the National Jewish Book Award as the best book of scholarship for their respective years.

Bibliography

 (with Jules Harlow, Harold Kushner, and Avram Israel Reisner)

See also
Conservative and Masorti rabbis

References

External links
List of "Tradition Today" columns by Rabbi Reuven Hammer in The Jerusalem Post
List of columns by Rabbi Reuven Hammer in Haaretz
The Pope and I by Reuven Hammer

American Conservative rabbis
American emigrants to Israel
Israeli Conservative rabbis
Jewish Theological Seminary of America semikhah recipients
Religious leaders from Syracuse, New York
The Jerusalem Post people
1933 births
2019 deaths
Deaths from brain cancer in Israel
20th-century American rabbis
21st-century American rabbis